Native Land is a 1942 documentary film directed by Leo Hurwitz and Paul Strand.

Synopsis
A combination of a documentary format and staged reenactments (influenced by the cinematic works of Sergi Eisenstein and Aleksandr Dovzhenko), the independently produced film depicted the struggle of trade unions against union-busting corporations, their spies and contractors. It was based on the 1938 report of the La Follette Committee's investigation of the repression of labor organizing.

Famous African-American singer, actor and activist Paul Robeson participated as an off-screen narrator and vocalist.

Cast
 Paul Robeson as Narrator and vocalist (voice)
 Fred Johnson as Fred Hill, a farmer
 Mary George as Hill's wife
 John Rennick as Hill's son
 Amelia Romano as Window scrubber
 Houseley Stevenson as White sharecropper
 Louis Grant as Black sharecropper
 James Hanney as Mack, Union president
 Howard Da Silva as Jim, an informer
 Art Smith as Harry Carlyle
 John Marley as Thug with crowbar

Legacy

Restoration and re-release
A restored version of the film was released in 2011. The film was restored by the UCLA Film & Television Archive, funded by the Packard Humanities Institute.

The new print was made “from the original 35mm nitrate picture negative, a 35mm safety duplicate negative, and a 35mm safety up-and-down track negative.”

The restoration premiered at the UCLA Festival of Preservation on March 26, 2011 and was screened at other North American cities in 2011 including  Vancouver.

References

External links

1942 films
1942 documentary films
Black-and-white documentary films
1942 drama films
American black-and-white films
Documentary films about labor relations in the United States
Paul Robeson
American drama films
American documentary films
1940s English-language films
1940s American films
1940s independent films